The Liberals Sgarbi, then renamed Liberals Sgarbi – The Libertarians, was a minor personalist-liberal political party in Italy.

The party was founded in March 1999 by Vittorio Sgarbi, a member of the Chamber of Deputies first elected in 1992 with the Italian Liberal Party, who later joined Forza Italia (1994), the Federalist Party (1995) and the Pannella-Sgarbi List (1996). In the 1999 European Parliament election, thanks to a new electoral pact with Forza Italia, Sgarbi was elected to the European Parliament and served there for two years. In 2001 he was re-elected to the Chamber of Deputies for Forza Italia.

In the 2004 European Parliament election the party formed a joint list with the Italian Republican Party, gainining 0.7% of the vote and no MEPs. In the 2006 general election, it sided with the centre-left The Union and was part of the Consumers' List, along with the Southern Democratic Party, but Sgarbi failed to be re-elected. In the same year's municipal election of Milan the party supported Letizia Moratti, who was elected mayor for the House of Freedoms coalition.

References 

Liberal parties in Italy
Political parties established in 1999
1999 establishments in Italy
Defunct political parties in Italy
Libertarianism in Italy
Libertarian parties
Political parties with year of disestablishment missing
Defunct liberal political parties